Don O'Neill (1924–2007) was a United States watercolor artist most noted for his depictions of historic downtown Riverside, California.  An architect by trade, he began painting in the 1960s, and eventually became Riverside's premier watercolorist.  O'Neill became the first resident of Southern California's Inland Empire to be accepted into the American Watercolor Society.
His grandchild is currently in charge of managing his artwork, at Don O'Neill's request.

Biography
Don O'Neill was born in 1924 in Buffalo, New York.  He received his Bachelor of Architecture degree from  Catholic University of America in Washington, DC in 1953, and was a practicing architect working in the Washington, DC and Riverside, California areas of the United States.

After retiring from architecture, O'Neill took up watercolor painting more seriously. He was taken on as a pupil of Milford Zornes, and eventually became a signature member of Watercolor West, the National Watercolor Society, and  the American Watercolor Society, and was the first Inland Empire resident to ever be accepted into the American Watercolor Society.

O'Neill died of pancreatic cancer in 2007 at the age of 83.

Recognition

 1982 Acquisition Award for Permanent Collection, Chaffey Community Art Association
 1982 First Award, Inland Exhibition XVIII, San Bernardino Co. Museum
 1983 First Award, 8th Annual Heritage Awards exhibit, Inland
 1985 Acquisition Award for Permanent Collection, Mt San Jacinto College
 1987 Accepted into 120th Annual Exhibit of American Watercolor Society. and received the Edgar Whitney Award
 1988 Purchase Award for Permanent Collection, Palos Verde Community Art Exhibit
 1989 Artist-in-residence, Na Bolom, San Cristobal Las Casas, Mexico
 1990 Harrison-Cady Award American Watercolor Society 123rd Annual Exhibition
 1992 Accepted into 125th Annual Exhibit of the American Watercolor Society and granted Signature Membership
 1994 Award of Excellence, Multi Media Mini XXV
 1995 Best of Show Award, Riverside Art Museum Membership Exhibit
 1997 Second Place Award, Multi Media Exhibit XXVIII
 1999 Work accepted into the 132nd Annual Exhibition of the American Watercolor Society.
 2005 Elizabeth Callan Award from the American Watercolor Society
 2007 Elizabeth Callan Award from the American Watercolor Society

See also

 Milford Zornes
 Watercolor painting
 American Watercolor Society

References

External links
 Official Website

1924 births
2007 deaths
Artists from Riverside, California
Artists from Buffalo, New York
20th-century American painters
American male painters
21st-century American painters
21st-century American male artists
American watercolorists
Architects from California
Painters from California
Deaths from pancreatic cancer
Catholic University of America alumni
Architects from Buffalo, New York
20th-century American male artists